Devi Sahai Jindal was an Indian industrialist and the founder of the Jindal Group, a leading steel industrial group in India. Born in the village of Nalwa in Hisar district in Haryana to  Netramji and Chandrawali Devi Jindal, Devi Sahai, along with his brother Bhavi Chand Jindal, founded a steel industrial company which grew over the years and is now split by business groups, DSJ Group, BCJ Group  OPJ Group and DPJ Group. He was honoured by the Government of India in 1971 with Padma Shri, the fourth highest Indian civilian award.

Business History 
The Jindal Group ventured into business activities in 1952. The first setup was in Howrah, for the manufacturing of Mild Steel, ERW, and Black Galvanised steel pipes and tubes.

References

Recipients of the Padma Shri in trade and industry
People from Hisar district
Businesspeople from Haryana
Year of birth missing
Year of death missing
Indian industrialists